The 2011 Torneo Clausura was part of the 61st completed season of the Primera B de Chile.

Everton de Viña del Mar was tournament's champion.

League table

References

External links
 RSSSF 2011

Primera B de Chile seasons
Primera B
Chil